Hunan Institute of Technology is a university located in Hengyang, Hunan, China.

As of fall 2013, the university has two campuses, a combined student body of 19,000 students, 1,000 faculty members.

The university consists of 12 colleges, with 30 specialties for undergraduates.

History
Hunan Institute of Technology was originated in 1975—one of the branch: "Hunan University at Hengyang".
In 2007, Hunan Institute of Building Materials Industry and "Hunan University at Hengyang" merged and formed the university: Hunan Institute of Technology.
The "Hunan Institute of Building Material Industry" was originated from former "Hengyang JiChu University" that was established in 1978 and was approved by both the Government of Hunan Province and the Department of Education of P.R. China.

Academics
 School of Mechanical engineering 
 School of Institute of electrical and Information engineering 
 School of Computer and Information Sciences
 School of Construction engineering and Art design 
 School of Safety and Environmental engineering 
 School of Materials and Chemical engineering 
 School of Economic management 
 School of Foreign languages 
 School of Mathematical 
 School of Physical education
 School of Political sciences
 School of Continuing education

Culture
 Motto:

People

Notable alumni
 Liu Anmin
 Wang Yong
 Tang Linka
 Luo Jingming

References

External links

Universities and colleges in Hunan
Educational institutions established in 1975
Education in Hengyang
1975 establishments in China